The Government of the 14th Dáil or the 6th Government of Ireland (13 June 1951 – 2 June 1954) was the government of Ireland formed after the general election held on 30 May 1951. It was a single-party Fianna Fáil government led by Éamon de Valera as Taoiseach.

The 6th Government lasted for  days.

6th Government of Ireland

Nomination of Taoiseach
The 14th Dáil first met on 13 June 1951. In the debate on the nomination of Taoiseach, outgoing Taoiseach John A. Costello of Fine Gael and Fianna Fáil leader Éamon de Valera were both proposed. Costello was defeated by a vote of 72 to 74, while de Valera was approved by a vote of 74 to 69. De Valera was appointed as Taoiseach by President Seán T. O'Kelly.

Members of the Government
After his appointment as Taoiseach by the president, Éamon de Valera proposed the members of the government and they were approved by the Dáil. They were appointed by the president on 14 June 1951.

Parliamentary Secretaries
On 19 June 1951, the Government appointed the Parliamentary Secretaries on the nomination of the Taoiseach.

Confidence in the government
On 30 June 1953, de Valera proposed a vote of confidence in the government. On 2 July, it was approved on a vote of 73 to 71.

See also
Dáil Éireann
Constitution of Ireland
Politics of the Republic of Ireland

References

Governments of Ireland
1951 establishments in Ireland
1954 disestablishments in Ireland
Cabinets established in 1951
Cabinets disestablished in 1954
Minority governments
14th Dáil